Grand Ronde or Grande Ronde may refer to: 

 Grand Ronde, Oregon, a place in Oregon, U.S.
 Confederated Tribes of the Grand Ronde Community of Oregon, a group of twenty-seven Native American tribes
 Grand Ronde Community, an Indian reservation in Oregon, U.S.
 Grande Ronde River, Oregon, U.S.
Grande Ronde Valley
 Grande Ronde Hospital, in La Grande, Oregon, U.S.
 Grande Ronde basalt, a member of the Columbia River basalt group
 Grande Ronde Aquifer

See also
Grand Rounds (disambiguation)